Bakers Island is a small, private residential island in Massachusetts Bay, in Salem, Massachusetts. It is located southeast of Great Misery Island & Little Misery Island, northeast of North Gooseberry Island and South Gooseberry Island, and far northeast of Children's Island. It is the outermost island on the main shipping channel into Salem Harbor. Bakers Island Light, located on the island's northern side, is used for navigation.

The island is pear-shaped. Most of its coast is rocky ledges, except for its western coast. There are three small landlocked ponds located near one another at the center. Vegetation on the island is trees and scrub.

There is a private pier on the west side.  Most of the buildings are concentrated in the western and southern portions of the island.

The approximately  island was known as Bakers Island as early as the 1630s. Originally owned by the Massachusetts Bay Colony, it was granted to the town of Salem in 1660. John Turner was the first private owner of the island. The island once housed a hotel, but is now almost entirely cottages, most of them individually named. The island also has a store, fire house, and the Sherman C. Burnham meeting hall.

The island initially had twin lights on a single house, first lit on January 3, 1798. Two towers were built in 1816 and 1820. The shorter tower was demolished in 1926.

Sources
Wise, DeWitt E., "Now, Then: Baker's Island," Baker's Island Association (1964).
Unauthored, "The Baker's Island Chronicle 1964-1988," Baker's Island Association (1989).

External links

Islands of Massachusetts
Salem, Massachusetts
Islands of Essex County, Massachusetts
Coastal islands of Massachusetts